Durvillaea antarctica, also known as  and , is a large, robust species of southern bull kelp found on the coasts of Chile, southern New Zealand, and Macquarie Island. D. antarctica, an alga, does not have air bladders, but floats due to a unique honeycomb structure within the alga's blades, which also helps the kelp avoid being damaged by the strong waves.

Taxonomy

The species was first described in 1822, as Fucus antarcticus, and revised in 1892 as Durvillaea antarctica. The genus name Durvillaea was given in memory of the French explorer Jules Dumont d'Urville, while the Latin derived epithet refers to antarctic.

In 2012, a taxonomic revision led to the recognition of a new species, Durvillaea poha, based on genetic, morphological and ecological evidence, which was previously recognised as the 'cape' lineage of Durvillaea antarctica. D. poha is the only other species in the genus to share the honeycombed structure and buoyancy of D. antarctica. D. poha occurs only in southern New Zealand and on subantarctic islands (including Snares and Auckland Islands), whereas D. antarctica has a wider distribution, and is found around New Zealand, Chile and other subantarctic islands. In southern New Zealand, D. poha and D. antarctica can be found growing together, although D. poha normally grows higher up or further back on the rock platforms, or in more sheltered bays, where wave force is weaker. D. poha generally has wider fronds than D. antarctica, and can appear more 'orange' across the frond area. Mitochondrial introgression has been observed between the two species, where some plants in Wellington exhibited the nuclear DNA of D. poha but also mitochondrial DNA belonging to D. antarctica.

Further diversity, with additional unclassified lineages have been identified within the species.

Description

The blades of Durvillaea antarctica are green to golden brown with a leathery texture. The honeycomb structure of the blade gives strength and buoyancy. This novel structure is thought to be responsible for the wide distribution of this genus, as the kelp is able to float when its holdfast fails. It can colonise other coastlines in this manner, and has been shown to carry communities of invertebrates across vast ocean distances from one shore to another. Specimens of D. antarctica have been found to float for up to 210 days, during which time high wind speeds transport kelp rafts up to 10,000 km. Environmental factors such as temperature, solar radiation and surface winds (all of which vary with latitude) affect buoyancy of rafts and their rate of travel. Rafts of D. antarctica are more likely to disperse offshore if plants detach during outgoing tides during autumn and winter. It is thought that this 'rafting' with Durvillaea antarctica and other floating seaweeds allowed a wide range of species to recolonise sub-Antarctic shores scoured clean by ice during the last Ice Age.

The holdfast of D. antarctica is large and is very difficult to remove. D. antarctica has to resist forces equivalent to 1100 km/h on land. The holdfast failing is usually the result of worms and molluscs which feed on the tissue because of the sheltered habitat it creates. It is also common for its host rock to be broken off without the holdfast losing its grip, with this contributing significantly to erosion in some areas. Recruitment rates of this species is very low, therefore the ecological impact of harvesting this species is too great.

Life cycle
Durvillaea antarctica reproduces sexually by producing egg and sperm that are released into the water. Eggs and sperm are produced on specific sites of the frond. A large individual can produce 100 million eggs in twelve hours. The season when reproduction occurs varies with location, but is generally during winter months.

Distribution

Durvillaea antarctica has a circumpolar distribution between the latitudes of 29°S and 55°S, found in Chile, southern New Zealand, and Macquarie Island. The type locality is Cape Horn, Chile.

It is found on exposed shores, especially in the northern parts of its range, and attaches itself with a strong holdfast.

Epifauna, parasites and rafting

Holdfasts of D. antarctica are often inhabited by a diverse array of epifaunal invertebrates, many of which burrow into and graze on the kelp. In New Zealand, epifaunal species include the crustaceans Parawaldeckia kidderi, P. karaka and Limnoria stephenseni, and the molluscs Cantharidus roseus, Onchidella marginata, Onithochiton neglectus, and Sypharochiton sinclairi. The intertidal spider Desis marina also inhabits the holdfasts of D. antarctica.

Plants of D. antarctica can from detach substrates, particularly during storms. The kelp floats as a raft and can travel vast distances at sea, driven by ocean currents. Kelp-associated invertebrates can be transported inside of drifting holdfasts, potentially leading to long-distance dispersal and a significant impact upon the population genetic structure of those species.

Fronds of D.  antarctica can be infected by an endophytic, phaeophycean algal parasite Herpodiscus durvillaeae (Lindauer) G. R. South. Fronds can also be infected Maullinia, a genus of intracellular, protistan parasites.  Based on genetic evidence, both H. durvillaeae and Maullinia have likely been dispersed across the Southern Hemisphere via rafting bull kelp.

Human use

Chilean culture

Use in cuisine
Stems and holdfasts of D. antarctica and D. incurvata are harvested from the coast of Chile and is used in Chilean cuisine for various recipes, including salads and stews. In Quechua the species is called:  (: lake, and : weed), and hulte.

Expression
The expression remojar el cochayuyo (literally: to soak the cochayuyo) is used in Chilean Spanish to refer to sexual intercourse. The expression derives from the fact that harvested D. antarctica is preserved by being sun-dried and then softened by soaking in a dish of water.

Māori culture
Along with D. poha, blades of D. antarctica are used to make traditional pōhā bags, which are used to carry and store food and fresh water, to propagate live shellfish, and to make clothing and equipment for sports. Pōhā are especially associated with Ngāi Tahu and are often used to carry and store muttonbird (tītī) chicks. The species is called  in Māori.

References

External links
 Algaebase: 'Durvillaea antarctica'' (Chamisso) Hariot
 Museum of New Zealand Te Papa Tongarewa: Durvillaea antarctica (Cham.) Har. (Species)
 Critter of the Week NZ Bull Kelp (Critter of the Week)

Fucales
Biota of Chile
Flora of Gough Island
Flora of New Zealand
Flora of Macquarie Island
Flora of Heard Island and McDonald Islands
Flora of the Kerguelen Islands
Flora of the Prince Edward Islands
Edible seaweeds
Species described in 1822